Propionaldehyde or propanal is the organic compound with the formula CH3CH2CHO. It is the 3-carbon aldehyde.  It is a colourless, flammable liquid with a slightly fruity odour. It is produced on a large scale industrially.

Production
Propionaldehyde is mainly produced industrially by hydroformylation of ethylene:
CO + H2 + C2H4 → CH3CH2CHO
In this way, several hundred thousand tons are produced annually.

Laboratory preparation
Propionaldehyde may also be prepared by oxidizing 1-propanol with a mixture of sulfuric acid and potassium dichromate. The reflux condenser contains water heated at 60 °C, which condenses unreacted propanol, but allows propionaldehyde to pass. The propionaldehyde vapor is immediately condensed into a suitable receiver. In this arrangement, any propionaldehyde formed is immediately removed from the reactor, thus it does not get over-oxidized to propionic acid.

Reactions

Propionaldehyde exhibits the reactions characteristic of alkyl aldehydes, e.g. hydrogenation, aldol condensations, oxidations, etc.  It is the simplest aldehyde with a prochiral methylene such that α-functionalized derivatives (CH3CH(X)CHO) are chiral.

Uses
It is predominantly used as a precursor to trimethylolethane (CH3C(CH2OH)3) through a condensation reaction with formaldehyde. This triol is an important intermediate in the production of alkyd resins. It is used in the synthesis of several common aroma compounds (cyclamen aldehyde, helional, lilial). Other applications include reduction to propanol and oxidation to propionic acid.

Laboratory uses
Propionaldehyde is a common reagent, being a building block to many compounds. Many of these uses exploit its participation in condensation reactions. With tert-butylamine it gives CH3CH2CH=N-t-Bu, a three-carbon building block used in organic synthesis.

Extraterrestrial occurrence
Propionaldehyde along with acrolein has been detected in the molecular cloud Sagittarius B2 near the center of the Milky Way Galaxy, about 26,000 light years from Earth.

Measurements by the COSAC and Ptolemy instruments on comet 67/P surface, revealed sixteen organic compounds, four of which were seen for the first time on a comet, including acetamide, acetone, methyl isocyanate and propionaldehyde.

Safety
With an LD50 of 1690 mg/kg (oral), propionaldehyde exhibits low acute toxicity.

References

Aldehydes
Hazardous air pollutants